Eddy Kahn (11 December 1906 – 19 August 1944) was a Dutch equestrian. He competed in two events at the 1936 Summer Olympics. He was killed in action during the Second World War.

Personal life
He was son of Leon and Paula Wilhelmine Kahn Emmerich, of Kneuterdijk, The Hague, Holland. Kahn served with the British Army as a lieutenant in the Royal Welch Fusiliers during the Second World War. He was killed in action while serving with the 6th Battalion, Royal Welch Fusiliers, part of the 53rd (Welsh) Infantry Division, during the Battle of Normandy on 19 August 1944. Kahn is buried in Banneville-la-Campagne War Cemetery.

References

External links

1906 births
1944 deaths
Dutch male equestrians
Olympic equestrians of the Netherlands
Equestrians at the 1936 Summer Olympics
Sportspeople from The Hague
British Army personnel killed in World War II
Royal Welch Fusiliers officers
Burials at Banneville-la-Campagne War Cemetery
Military personnel from The Hague